Seth Marvin "Moe" Morehead (August 15, 1934 – January 17, 2006) was a left-handed specialist reliever in Major League Baseball. He was born in Houston, Texas.
 
Morehead was signed by the Philadelphia Phillies as an amateur free agent in 1952 out of C. E. Byrd High School in Shreveport, LA. He spent five seasons in the major leagues pitching in parts of three seasons with the Phillies (1957–59), two seasons with the Chicago Cubs (1959–60) and one season with the Milwaukee Braves (1961).

Morehead posted a 5–19 record with a 4.81 ERA and five saves in 132 games pitched (24 as a starter). Among his career highlights was being the last pitcher to face Roy Campanella and also the last pitcher to face the Brooklyn Dodgers before the team moved to Los Angeles after the 1957 season.

Following his baseball career, Morehead graduated from Baylor University with a degree in business. He worked in banking for 36 years before retiring in 1999.

Morehead died in Shreveport, Louisiana, at the age of 71.

References

External links

Baseball Library
The Deadball Era

1934 births
2006 deaths
Baseball players from Houston
Baylor Bears baseball players
Baylor University alumni
Bradford Phillies players
Chicago Cubs players
Denver Bears players
Fort Worth Cats players
Major League Baseball pitchers
Miami Eagles players
Miami Marlins (IL) players
Milwaukee Braves players
Philadelphia Phillies players
Schenectady Blue Jays players
Syracuse Chiefs players
Terre Haute Phillies players
Toronto Maple Leafs (International League) players
Vancouver Mounties players
Wilmington Blue Rocks (1940–1952) players